Dear Eloise may refer to:

 "Dear Eloise", a song by the Hollies from their 1967 album Butterfly
 Dear Eloise (band), a Chinese rock band